John Maugridge Snowden (January 13, 1776 – April 1, 1845) served as Mayor of Pittsburgh City  from 1825 to 1828.

Early life
Snowden was born in Philadelphia, Pennsylvania to a revolutionary war family of patriots. His father, William Snowden, was a hero of the war, being imprisoned by the British forces and dying in their custody.  His wife Elizabeth Moor, was a major advisor to General Washington during his Pennsylvania campaigns. In 1811 Snowden began a printing and book business in Pittsburgh. He eventually bought and edited his own newspaper, the Pittsburgh Mercury. Like his predecessor as Mayor, John Darragh, he used his appointment as President of the Bank of Pittsburgh to launch his mayoral candidacy.

Pittsburgh politics

Snowden served terms as Allegheny County Recorder and Treasurer before being elected mayor of Pittsburgh in 1825. He served until 1828.

Later life
Mayor Snowden died suddenly of heart disease on April 1, 1845 at his residence in Allegheny City, now Pittsburgh's North Side. He was buried at Concord Presbyterian Church on Brownsville Road, near his home there.

Honors
Allegheny County's community Snowden (part of present-day South Park Township) was named for John Snowden.

References

1776 births
1845 deaths
Mayors of Pittsburgh
Pennsylvania Democratic-Republicans
Pennsylvania Jacksonians
19th-century American politicians
Pennsylvania Democrats
Journalists from Pennsylvania
19th-century American newspaper editors
19th-century American newspaper publishers (people)
American male journalists